Johan Herman Wessel (6 October 1742 – 29 December 1785) was an 18th-century Danish-Norwegian poet, satirist and playwright. His written work  was characterized by the use of parody and satiric wit.

Biography
Wessel was born and raised at Vestby in Akershus, Norway. He was the son of Jonas Wessel (1707–1785) and Helene Maria Schumacher (1715–1789). His father was a parish priest.  He was one of thirteen children in a family. His younger brothers included  mathematician Caspar Wessel (1745–1818) and jurist Ole Christopher Wessel (1744–1794) His sister-in-law was landowner Maren Juel (1749–1815) and  naval hero Peter Tordenskjold (1690–1720) was his great uncle.

He entered attended Oslo Cathedral School in 1757 followed by the University of Copenhagen in 1761. At the university, he studied foreign languages. He later made a living principally as a tutor and translator. He lived most of his somewhat bohemian life in Copenhagen, dependent on casual work and weakened by bad health and drinking. Wessel became the admired centre of The Norwegian Society (Norske Selskab) a grouping of Norwegian literary figures cultivating their national identity in Copenhagen, and writing in classical metres.

Personal life
In 1780, he married Anna Catharia Bukier (1748–1813). They were the parents of one son, Jonas Wessel who was born in 1781. The marriage suffered from his alcoholism, depression and inability as a provider. Johan Herman Wessel died at age 43 in Copenhagen and was buried in the cemetery of Trinitatis Church.

Works
Wessel's poems and plays are frequently satirical and humorous. His literary style is deliberate elaborate and digressive and at the same time elegant and witty. Another genre is the epigram that he mastered, especially his short, witty, impudent, precise and also self-ironic commemorative poems.

Wessel is known first of all for his many humorous and satiric verse tales referring to man's foolishness and injustice. Most notable is Smeden og Bageren ("The Smith and the Baker") about the only smith of a village who is pardoned for manslaughter since the village people need one, while a more superfluous baker is executed instead (there are two bakers, the village only needs one) in order to observe the rules that "life pays life".

In Herremanden ("The Squire") a man coming to Hell makes unpleasant discoveries of the origin of his own son while Hundemordet ("The Dog Murder") tells about wrangle about trivial things.

His satirical play Kierlighed uden Strømper ( Love without Stockings, 1772—with epilogue, 1774) is a generic parody of neoclassical tragedy; it takes place in a daily milieu of banal conflicts but observes the formal rules of "heroic language". It is still performed.

Another play Anno 7603  was written in 1781. It has a low literary value, and it has never been performed—it is held in such low esteem that it is often omitted from lists of his works —but it has some cult status since this is one of the first examples of time travel in fiction.  The main characters, Leander and Julie, are moved by a fairy  to a future (AD 7603) in which gender roles have been switched and only women are allowed to fight in the military.

The traditional restaurant Wesselstuen in Bergen, Norway features many  decorations inspired by his works.

See also
 Johannes Ewald and Johan Hermann Wessel Memorial

References

Other sources
 Liv Bliksrud, Johan Herman Wessel og hans tid, Wesselakademiet, 2000.  (Norwegian)
 Liv Bliksrud, Den smilende makten : Norske Selskab i København og Johan Herman Wessel, Aschehoug, 1999. . (Norwegian)

External links
Wesselstuen website

1742 births
1785 deaths
People from Akershus
People from Vestby
People educated at Oslo Cathedral School
University of Copenhagen alumni
Norwegian translators
Norwegian satirists
Danish satirists
Norwegian male poets
Danish male poets
Norwegian dramatists and playwrights
18th-century Danish dramatists and playwrights
Danish male dramatists and playwrights
18th-century Norwegian poets
Burials at Trinitatis Church
18th-century male writers
18th-century translators